Dasyproctidae is a family of large South American rodents, comprising the agoutis and acouchis. Their fur is a reddish or dark colour above, with a paler underside. They are herbivorous, often feeding on ripe fruit that falls from trees. They live in burrows, and, like squirrels, will bury some of their food for later use.

Dasyproctids exist in Central and South America, which are the tropical parts of the New World. The fossil record of this family can be traced back to the Late Oligocene (Deseadan in the SALMA classification).

As with all rodents, members of this family have incisors, pre-molars, and molars, but no canines. The cheek teeth are hypsodont and flat-crowned.

Classification 
Fossil taxa follow McKenna and Bell, with modifications following Kramarz.

 Family Dasyproctidae
 Genus †Alloiomys
 Genus †Australoprocta
 Genus †Branisamys
 Genus †Incamys
 Genus †Neoreomys
 Genus †Megastus
 Genus †Palmiramys
 Genus Dasyprocta
 Azara's agouti, D. azarae
 Coiban agouti, D. coibae
 Crested agouti, D. cristata
 Black agouti, D. fuliginosa
 Orinoco agouti, D. guamara
 Kalinowski's agouti, D. kalinowskii
 Red-rumped agouti, D. leporina
 Mexican agouti, D. mexicana
 Black-rumped agouti, D. prymnolopha
 Central American agouti, D. punctata
 Ruatan Island agouti, D. ruatanica
 Genus Myoprocta
 Green acouchi, M. pratti
 Red acouchi, M. acouchy

The pacas (genus Cuniculus) are placed by some authorities in Dasyproctidae, but molecular studies have demonstrated they do not form a monophyletic group.

References

External links 
 Central American agouti at Smithsonian
 Dasyproctidae at Animaldiversity.org
 2014 - Figueira et al. - Carrion consumption by Dasyprocta leporina (Rodentia: Dasyproctidae) and a review of meat use by agoutis

 
Hystricognath rodents
Rodent families
Extant Chattian first appearances
Mammals described in 1825